The following is a list of FCC-licensed radio stations in the U.S. state of Kentucky, which can be sorted by their call signs, frequencies, cities of license, licensees, and programming formats.

List of radio stations

Defunct
 WAIA
 WANY
 WBLG-LP
 WCPM
 WCYN-FM
 WEKC (Williamsburg, Kentucky)
 WENS-LP
 WFLE
 WFUL
 WGRK
 WIAR
 WKYD-LP
 WKYR
 WLBJ
 WLGC
 WLKS
 WMMG
 WMOR
 WMTC
 WQFR-LP
 WQXY
 WRLV
 WRSL
 WSMJ
 WWLK
 WYAH-LP

See also
 Kentucky media
 List of newspapers in Kentucky
 List of television stations in Kentucky
 Media of cities in Kentucky: Bowling Green, Lexington, Louisville

References

Bibliography
  (About WHAS and early radio in general)

External links

 Kentucky Broadcasters Association

Images

 
Kentucky
Radio